David R. Megarry is a game designer most notable for the board game Dungeon!.

Career

Early gaming and Blackmoor 

Dave Megarry was a member of the Midwest Military Simulation Association (MMSA), along with Dave Arneson, David Wesely, Ken Fletcher, John and Richard Snider and others. Jon Peterson identifies Megarry as playing the King of Prussia in their Napoleonic wargames campaigns. Megarry was also a member of Dave Arneson's original Twin Cities Blackmoor group.

Megarry has brought to light Blackmoor gaming materials used in the early days of the game. These include regional maps, dungeon maps, and character matrices. The Blackmoor character matrices start in 1971, and cover approximately 20 characters played over time. The various attributes include Brains, Leadership, Courage, Health, Woodcraft, Horsemanship, Sailing, etc. They also include some history about each character, including the character's death. Megarry has described the character sheets as a "moving history."

Development of Dungeon! 

Megarry designed a board game (which would ultimately be called Dungeon!) where players explored a dungeon on a singular basis, a game that was inspired by Braunstein playing sessions with Arneson. Jon Peterson traces the development of Dungeon! to a short Blackmoor campaign hiatus in 1972, which resulted in other players running their own games, such as Greg Svenson, Pete Gaylord, and John Snider. Dave Megarry took the underworld component of Blackmoor and turned it into a dungeon exploration board game with randomly-selected monsters and treasure. One early version of this game was called The Dungeons of Pasha Cada.

The earliest prototype dungeon board was preserved by Megarry, but the instructions are missing. The earliest complete version of The Dungeons of Pasha Cada was preserved by a friend who received a hand-made copy in 1973. This early version of the game includes 30 monsters, and the player characters are the standard Hero, Superhero, Wizard, and Elf.

Some sources link the Dungeon! combat results table to Table T, in Charles Totten's 1880 book on military wargaming, Strategos, which was widely read and used by MMSA members. Table T was commonly implemented in Twin Cities Strategos-based games such as Strategos N.

Publication of Dungeon! 

After developing the game, Megarry contacted Parker Brothers to see if they had interest in the game, but received a rejection letter. Also in 1972, Gary Gygax expressed an interest in Blackmoor and the dungeon board game, and invited Arneson and Megarry to Lake Geneva, Wisconsin, to demonstrate their games. According to Jon Peterson, this was likely done with the understanding that this could lead to eventual publication by Guidon Games.

In November 1972, Dave Arneson and Dave Megarry traveled to Lake Geneva to meet with Gary Gygax, to provide a demonstration of their games. While meeting at Gygax's house, Dave Arneson ran the Lake Geneva gamers through their first session of Blackmoor. Rob Kuntz describes Dave Arneson as the referee, and the Lake Geneva players as being Gary Gygax, Ernie Gygax, Terry Kuntz, and himself. Kuntz describes Dave Megarry as the de facto leader of the group, as he understood the Blackmoor game and campaign world. In Wargaming magazine, Rob Kuntz wrote a short summary of their first Blackmoor session:

After Megarry showed his board game to Gygax, they continued to correspond about it. In 1973 they presented The Dungeons of Pasha Cada to various manufacturers, including Don Lowry of Guidon Games. Lowry was concerned that the dungeon maps would be too expensive to print. The game would eventually be published by TSR Hobbies as Dungeon! in 1975.

Work at TSR 

Dave Megarry was hired by TSR in 1975, the same year they published his Dungeon! board game.

Megarry called Bill Owen of Judges Guild to negotiate a formal license from September 4 – November 22, 1976; this agreement required Judges Guild to pay a royalty to TSR for the right to place text on the cover of most products saying "Approved for use with Dungeons & Dragons".

Arneson left TSR in 1976 over creative differences, and Megarry left around the same time.

Influence 

Knucklebones magazine identified Megarry's Dungeon! as the first game in the genre of adventure board games.

References

American game designers
Living people
Place of birth missing (living people)
Year of birth missing (living people)